Thornwood is a hamlet in the civil parish of North Weald Bassett, in the Epping Forest district of Essex, England. The hamlet contains a village hall, a small industrial estate and a trout fishery.

External links
Parish Hall, Thornwood - North Weald Bassett Parish Council
Thornwood Springs fishery

Hamlets in Essex
North Weald Bassett